Laguna de Ayarza is a crater lake in Guatemala. The lake is a caldera that was created some 20,000 years ago by a catastrophic eruption that destroyed a twinned volcano and blanketed the entire region with a layer of pumice. The lake has a surface area of 14 km² and a maximum depth of 230 m. The lake has a surface elevation of 1409 m.

References

External links

 

Ayarza
Ayarza
Ayarza
Geography of the Santa Rosa Department, Guatemala
Pleistocene calderas
Volcanoes of Guatemala